The 2004 Cleveland Browns season was the team's 56th season and 52nd with the National Football League. The Browns were looking to improve on their 5–11 record from 2003 and return to their 2002 playoff position; however, hindered by a tough schedule they regressed further and only won four games. On November 30, Butch Davis resigned as head coach and general manager of the team. He was succeeded by offensive coordinator Terry Robiskie. Robiskie promoted tight end coach Rob Chudzinski to offensive coordinator.

On September 12, the Browns defeated the Baltimore Ravens, 20–3, marking the team's only Week 1 win since returning to the NFL in 1999 until they defeated the Carolina Panthers in 2022, 26-24. In the 24 seasons since the Browns returned to the league, the Browns opening week record is 2–20–1.

2004 NFL Draft

Personnel

Roster

Schedule 
Football statistics site Football Outsiders calculated that the 2004 Browns played the toughest schedule of any NFL team between 1989 and 2013, based on strength of opponent, although Pro Football Reference argues that their schedule was only the fifth-toughest in this span and twelfth-toughest non-strike since 1971. The Browns played just one game – their Week 16 contest against the Miami Dolphins – against a team with fewer than six wins, and played five against opponents with 12 or more wins, including a total of three against Steelers and Patriots who were a combined 28–2 against their remaining opponents.

Apart from their AFC North division games, the Browns played against the AFC East and NFC East according to the conference rotation, and played the Chargers and Texans based on 2003 divisional positions.

Standings

Notes

References

External links 
 2004 Cleveland Browns at Pro Football Reference (Profootballreference.com)
 2004 Cleveland Browns Statistics at jt-sw.com
 2004 Cleveland Browns Schedule at jt-sw.com
 2004 Cleveland Browns at DatabaseFootball.com  

Cleveland
Cleveland Browns seasons
Cleveland